Orazio Fagone (born 13 November 1968) is an Italian sledge hockey player and former short track speed skater who competed in the 1988 Winter Olympics, 1992 Winter Olympics and 1994 Winter Olympics. After a motorcycle accident, he also competed as paralympic hockey player and wheelchair curler.

Short track career
Fagone competed in the first short track speed skating events at the 1988 Winter Olympics when this sport was a demonstration sport. He finished third in the 1500 metres and as a member of the Italian relay team, he finished second in the 5000 metre relay.

At the 1992 Winter Olympics in Albertville, Fagone finished eighth with the Italian team in the 5000 metre relay competition. In the 1000 metres, he finished 24th.

At the 1994 Winter Olympics in Lillehammer, Fagone was part of the Italian team which won the gold medal in the 5000 metre relay competition. In the 1000 metres, he finished 15th and in the 500 metres, he finished 31st.

Accident
In 1997, Fagone's right leg was amputated after a motorcycle accident, ending his hopes for a return to the 1998 Winter Olympics. After the accident, Fagone started to play sledge hockey and competed in the 2006 Winter Paralympics as a member of the Italian national sledge hockey team. This made Fagone the third Winter Olympian to also compete in the Paralympics and the first disabled one (the other two were sighted guides).

Wheelchair curling teams and events

See also
List of athletes who have competed in the Paralympics and Olympics

References

External links
Orazio Fagone at ISU

1968 births
Living people
Italian male short track speed skaters
Olympic short track speed skaters of Italy
Short track speed skaters at the 1988 Winter Olympics
Short track speed skaters at the 1992 Winter Olympics
Short track speed skaters at the 1994 Winter Olympics
Olympic gold medalists for Italy
Sportspeople from Catania
Italian amputees
Olympic medalists in short track speed skating
Medalists at the 1994 Winter Olympics
Ice sledge hockey players at the 2006 Winter Paralympics
Italian disabled sportspeople
Italian male curlers
Italian wheelchair curlers
Italian sledge hockey players